Nemanja Krznarić  (Serbian Cyrillic: Немања Крзнарић; born 29 May 1984) is a Serbian football coach and a former goalkeeper. He is the goalkeepers coach at Mladost Lučani.

Honours
Napredak
Serbian First League: 2012–13

External links
 Nemanja Krznarić stats at Srbijafudbal.
 
 

Association football goalkeepers
Serbian footballers
FK Borac Čačak players
FK Remont Čačak players
FK Mladi Radnik players
FK Metalac Gornji Milanovac players
FK Mladost Lučani players
FK Napredak Kruševac players
Serbian First League players
Serbian SuperLiga players
1984 births
Living people